Ina Hartwig (born 11 July 1963) is a German writer, literature critic and academic lecturer. From July 2016, she has been Kulturdezernentin in Frankfurt, the city councillor responsible for culture and science.

Early life and education 
Hartwig was born in Hamburg, Germany, and went to school in Lüneburg.

She then received her Ph.D. at the Universität Duisburg-Essen with a dissertation about Proust, Musil, Genet and Elfriede Jelinek.

Career 
Hartwig started her career teaching at the Free University of Berlin. In 1997, she moved to Frankfurt am Main as a journalist of the Frankfurter Rundschau, where she was a features editor from 1999 to 2009. She was, together with Tilman Spengler, publisher of the journal  from 2002 to 2004. She was a guest professor for literary criticism in St. Louis, US (2002), Göttingen (2007/08) and at the Deutsches Literaturinstitut in Leipzig (2014/15). In 2015/16, she was a Fellow at the Wissenschaftskolleg in Berlin.

From 2010 to 2016, she was a freelance author, critic and moderator, publishing in Süddeutsche Zeitung and Die Zeit, among others. She was a regular guest in the 3sat  (culture time), and was from 2013 to 2016 on the team of the literature series Buchzeit (book time). She served on the juries of the prize of Leipzig Book Fair and of German Book Prize, and from 2014 on the commission for the Goethe Medal of the Goethe Institute. She is a member of the PEN-Zentrum Deutschland. She was a co-author for the 2016 film , directed by Ruth Beckermann, about Ingeborg Bachmann and Paul Celan. She published a biography of Bachmann, Wer war Ingeborg Bachmann?, in November 2017.

Hartwig has been a member of the Social Democratic Party of Germany (SPD) from 2012. She was elected Kulturdezernentin in Frankfurt on 14 July 2016. When she took up the office she called for more experiments and alternative art forms. She also promoted collaboration with Frankfurt's sister cities, and critical public discussion of political topics. She reinstated free municipal museum visits for children under age 18. She is m member of the supervisory board of the Schirn Kunsthalle Frankfurt.

Awards 
 2011: Alfred-Kerr-Preis for literary criticism
 2011: Caroline-Schlegel-Preis of Jena

Publications 
 Sexuelle Poetik. Proust, Musil, Genet, Jelinek. S. Fischer, Frankfurt am Main 1998,  (also: Essen University, Dissertation)
 Das Geheimfach ist offen. Über Literatur. S. Fischer, Frankfurt am Main 2012, .
 Wer war Ingeborg Bachmann? Eine Biographie in Bruchstücken. S. Fischer, Frankfurt am Main 2017,

References

External links 

 
 
 Ina Hartwig: Die Dreißigjährigen single-generation.de
 Christina Mohr: Ina Hartwig, Literaturkritikerin. Literaturkritik muss brutal sein. Für die Literaturkritikerin Ina Hartwig ist in ihrem Beruf nicht Objektivität, sondern Haltung gefragt bookster-frankfurt.de, 21 October 2014

German women writers
German journalists
1963 births
Living people
Writers from Hamburg
Free University of Berlin alumni
University of Duisburg-Essen alumni
Academic staff of the Free University of Berlin
Social Democratic Party of Germany politicians